Sunset is a ghost town in Pocahontas County, West Virginia. Sunset appeared on USGS maps as late as 1901.

The community lies west of Sunrise, Virginia, hence the name.

References

Geography of Pocahontas County, West Virginia
Ghost towns in West Virginia